Erden is a municipality in Rhineland-Palatinate, Germany.

Erden may also refer to:

Places
 Erden, Bulgaria, a village in Montana Province

People
 Cüneyt Erden (born 1977), Turkish basketball player
 Şaban Erden (born 1949), Deputy Secretary General of the Istanbul Metropolitan Municipality
 Semih Erden (born 1986), Turkish basketball player
 Erden Alkan (born 1941), Turkish actor living in Germany
 Erden Eruç (born 1961), Turkish-American adventurer

Turkish-language surnames
Turkish masculine given names